Tennis at the 2007 Pacific Games in Apia was held on August 27 – September 6, 2007.

Medal summary

Medal table

Medals events

See also
 Tennis at the Pacific Games

References

2007 South Pacific Games
Pacific Games
2007